Richard Dean Pryor (November 22, 1930 – March 4, 2019) was an American football player and coach and decathlete. He served as the head football coach at Hastings College in Hastings, Nebraska from 1964 to 1966 and South Dakota State University from 1970 to 1971, comping a career college football coaching record of 18–28–1.

Pryor played college football at the University of Arkansas from 1950 to 1952. In 1952, he participated in the United States Olympic Trials in the decathlon, finishing in eighth place.

One of his first coaching jobs was at Coffeyville Community College in Coffeyville, Kansas, where he was an assistant football coach and head track coach.

Head coaching record

Football

References

1930 births
2019 deaths
American male decathletes
American football running backs
Arkansas Razorbacks football players
Arkansas Razorbacks men's track and field athletes
Coffeyville Red Ravens football coaches
Hastings Broncos football coaches
Kansas State Wildcats football coaches
South Dakota State Jackrabbits football coaches
Wichita State Shockers football coaches
High school football coaches in Florida
People from Nemaha County, Kansas
Players of American football from Kansas